SlingShot is a reverse bungee ride manufactured by Funtime. Cedar Fair amusement parks that feature the ride include Cedar Point, Carowinds, and Canada's Wonderland. An additional fee is required to ride, which is separate from park admission.

History
Slingshot at Cedar Fair park locations first opened at Kings Island in 2002. A similar installation opened at Cedar Point in 2014, along with the addition of Pipe Scream and Lake Erie Eagles, and a renovated Gemini Midway. It was built by Funtime. It opened at Cedar Point on July 2, 2014, after being open to employees for a few days.

The ride utilizes a fluctuating price structure, where the cost raises or lowers depending on the day of the week. Riders can also purchase an on-ride video recording for an additional fee.

Ride

Kings Island

Cedar Point

Riders in a two-person capsule are attached to cables and a patented spring propulsion device incorporating up to 720 specially designed springs. The ride is the second highest at Cedar Point, about  shorter than Top Thrill Dragster and  higher than Millennium Force.

Carowinds
SlingShot is located in the Carousel Park area.

Canada's Wonderland
SlingShot is located in the Action Zone area. The capsule is launched  at speeds up to 100 km/h.

References

External links

 Official SlingShot Cedar Point page
 Official Sling Shot Kings Island page

2002 establishments in Ohio
2014 establishments in Ohio
2014 establishments in North Carolina
2015 establishments in Ontario
Amusement rides introduced in 2002
Amusement rides introduced in 2014
Amusement rides introduced in 2015
Amusement rides manufactured by Funtime
Carowinds
Cedar Fair attractions